Giannis Dosis (born 24 October 1992) is a Greek professional footballer who plays as a left-back for Doxa Drama.

Honours
Volos
Gamma Ethniki: 2017–18

References

1992 births
Living people
Greek footballers
Football League (Greece) players
Gamma Ethniki players
Kavala F.C. players
Pierikos F.C. players
Agrotikos Asteras F.C. players
Volos N.F.C. players
Trikala F.C. players
Association football defenders
Footballers from Katerini